Deering Reservoir is a  water body located in Hillsborough County in southern New Hampshire, United States, in the town of Deering. The lake serves as the headwaters to the Piscataquog River, which flows east to the Merrimack River in Manchester.

The lake is classified as a warmwater fishery, with observed species including rainbow trout, smallmouth bass, largemouth bass, white perch, horned pout, and chain pickerel.

See also

List of lakes in New Hampshire

References

Lakes of Hillsborough County, New Hampshire
Reservoirs in New Hampshire